Beech Hall School is a private school in Macclesfield, England and is a member of both IAPS (Independent Association of Preparatory Schools) and ISA (Independent Schools Association).

History
Beech Hall School was founded in 1926 as a preparatory school for boys.

The site which Beech Hall stands on dates back to the Iron Age, where it would have been used as a defensive site. The house named Beech Hall has been in existence on the site since 1435, when it was the main residence of the Worth family. In Victorian times it was called Higher Beech; it has been called Beech Hall since the start of the 20th century. Beech Hall itself is a large country house set in over sixteen acres of wooded grounds.

In 1960 the swimming pool at Beech Hall School was built; during excavation a Bronze Age clay pot, which contained burial bones, was discovered.

In 1966, the school became a limited company and a charitable trust. Girls were first admitted in 1981, and by 2009 one third of the pupils were girls.

Extracurricular
School sports include football, hockey, netball, and cricket and there are several teams for boys and girls.

Private schools in the Borough of Cheshire East